Arturo Bocchini (12 February 1880 – 20 November 1940) was an Italian civil servant, who was appointed Chief of the Police under the Fascist regime of Benito Mussolini. Bocchini held the office from September 1926 until his death in November 1940, becoming a key figure in the Italian regime.

He was the head both of the regular police (State Police) and the secret police (OVRA) which was a pervasive national security agency that operated at all levels of Italian society. Bocchini only reported  directly to the Duce and operated autonomously without interference from the National Fascist Party and the state prefects. His power within the government led to him being called the "Vice Duce".

Early life
 Bocchini was the last of the seven children born in San Giorgio La Montagna, near Benevento to Ciriaco Bocchini, a wealthy landowner, and his mother was Concetta Padiglione, a member of the aristocratic but liberal Padiglione family. After Bocchini graduated with a Law degree from the Federico II University in Naples in 1902, he joined the prefectural civil service. After Mussolini took power in 1922, Bocchini was appointed by Deputy Minister Aldo Finzi as the Prefect of Brescia (1922–1923),  then Bologna (1923–1925), and finally Genoa (1925–1926).

National Chief of Police

In 1926 Mussolini, on the advice of Luigi Federzoni (who knew him from Bologna), made Bocchini Rome's Chief of Police and de facto head of all civil law enforcement in Fascist Italy. Bocchini had control over the regular Polizia di Stato and the OVRA, the political police of the National Fascist Party. Despite his political attempts, the Carabinieri, the national Gendarmerie of Italy, remained under the control of the Royal Italian Army.

Mussolini entrusted him with the job of maintaining order in Italy. To achieve this, Bocchini was granted maximum political coverage and complete freedom of action, as well as the privilege of reporting directly to Mussolini.  As Rome's Chief of Police, Bocchini oversaw the arrest and brutal treatment of many prominent anti-fascists, such as Antonio Gramsci, who died in April 1937, aged 45. 

His position of power within the fascist regime was strengthened by his close relationship with his German counterpart Reichsführer-SS Heinrich Himmler. In two official visits, to Germany in 1936 and in 1938 to Italy, Bocchini and Himmler met to coordinate how the OVRA and the Nazis' Gestapo and Sicherheitsdienst could work internationally to share and gather intelligence and arrest political/ideological enemies.

Death

Bocchini died of a stroke in Rome in November 1940. His funeral was attended by notable leaders from Nazi Germany's police and security agencies such as Reichsführer-SS Heinrich Himmler, SS-Obergruppenführer Karl Wolff, and chief of the RSHA, SS-Obergruppenführer und General der Polizei Reinhard Heydrich.

References

1880 births
1940 deaths
People from the Province of Benevento
Italian fascists
Polizia di Stato